The Big Show is a 1961 DeLuxe Color and CinemaScope drama film directed by James B. Clark, starring Esther Williams and Cliff Robertson. The cast also includes Robert Vaughn, Margia Dean, Nehemiah Persoff and David Nelson, who was best known to audiences of the time for The Adventures of Ozzie and Harriet television show.

This is the third variation of Jerome Weidman's novel I'll Never Go There Any More. The other two are Broken Lance (1954) a western version starring Spencer Tracy, and House of Strangers (1949) set in the big city starring Edward G. Robinson.

Plot
Bruno Everhard (Persoff) is the rigid and uncompromising owner of a German traveling circus. His four sons and daughter all work for the circus, including as performers. Three of the boys, in particular Klaus (Vaughn), resent the favoritism Bruno shows one son, Josef (Robertson).

To curry his father's favor, Klaus abandons his sweetheart, circus aerialist Carlotta Martinez (Dean), to instead marry Teresa Vizzini (Mannhardt), whose father operates an animal menagerie that Bruno would like to merge with as a result. Josef, meantime, has fallen in love with a wealthy American woman, Hillary Allen (Williams), who wants him to quit the circus and begin a new life.

Bruno is defied by his daughter, who marries Eric (Nelson), a soldier who wishes to try the trapeze. Teresa, distraught at learning why Klaus married her, commits suicide at the circus, stepping into the cage of man-eating bear.

Carlotta, too, is almost killed, due to a faulty high wire during her act. Negligence is charged and Josef accepts the blame, sparing his father from having to go to prison. The other brothers seize the opportunity to take control of the circus. Bruno attempts a comeback on the trapeze, but has a heart attack and dies.

Released from prison, Josef vows revenge. Klaus decides to kill his own brother, but steps too close to the bear's cage and is killed. Wishing there to be no more violence or retribution, Josef decides to leave the circus for good, and Hillary agrees to marry him.

Cast
 Esther Williams as Hillary Allen
 Cliff Robertson as Josef Everard
 Nehemiah Persoff as Bruno Everard
 Robert Vaughn as Klaus Everard
 Margia Dean as Carlotta Martinez
 David Nelson as Eric Solden
 Carol Christensen as Garda Everard
 Kurt Pecher as Hans Everard
 Renate Mannhardt as Teresa Vizzini
 Franco Andrei as Fredrik Everard
 Peter Capell as Pietro Vizzini
 Stefan Schnabel as Lawyer
 Carleton Young as Judge Richter
 Philo Hauser as Ringmaster
 Mariza Tomic as Fraustein

Production
James Clark and Ted Sherdeman had worked together on A Dog of Flanders for Associated Producers Inc (API). They formed their own company, Gemtaur Productions, and made The Big Show with API.

At one stage Millie Perkins was announced for the lead.

The film was shot in Munich Germany and Copenhagen in November 1960.

Esther Williams insisted on writing her own dialogue.

Reception
Maury Dexter says the film was a moderate success at the box office.

Critical response
Howard Thompson of The New York Times wrote in his review of the film: "Against the excellently staged sawdust numbers (the polar bear act is fascinating), the increasingly ugly incidents edge toward dank, Gothic melodrama (a trial and a murderous climactic fight). There is little lightness or imagination in either the script or the directing. As softening concessions, we have two obvious romantic interludes. In one, young Carol Christensen pairs off with David Nelson, as a smitten American soldier—and the youngsters do very nicely. The main match brackets the laconic Mr. Robertson, as the noblest circus heir, and a starry-eyed Miss Williams, in the briefest role of her career, as a rich American expatriate without a pool to her name. She does dip once, swiftly, in an inserted and strikingly photographed, resort sequence (Scandinavia). The film's best performance, with the cast striving hard, comes from Renate Mannhardt, as a lovely, betrayed bear tamer. Robert Vaughn, Margia Dean and Kurt Fecher are okay in other supporting parts. But The Big Show is an unappetizing bill of goods, beautiful to look at."

Clark and Sherman worked on another film for API, Brother, but it appears to have not been made.

Release
The Big Show was released in theatres on July 14, 1961. The film was released on DVD on December 11, 2012.

See also
 List of American films of 1961

References

Sources

External links 
 
 
 
 

1961 films
1961 drama films
American drama films
Films directed by James B. Clark
Circus films
Films set in West Germany
20th Century Fox films
Films scored by Paul Sawtell
1960s English-language films
1960s American films